The N18 road is a national primary road in Ireland, connecting the cities of Limerick and Galway. Ennis and Gort are two major towns on the route, and Shannon Airport is reached via the connecting N19. The west coast route continues on to Sligo as the N17. The section from Limerick to the N19 junction forms part of European route E20, and the entire route is part of the proposed Atlantic Corridor. The section of motorway from Shannon to Claregalway is designated the M18 motorway. The tolled Limerick Tunnel forms part of the route.

Route

N18 Limerick to Shannon
As of 27 July 2010, the N18 commences at the Rosbrien interchange, a major interchange south of Limerick city, where it joins the M7 motorway to Dublin and M20 motorway towards Cork and Tralee. The dual carriageway continues north, intersecting with the N69 road, before crossing under the River Shannon using the Limerick Tunnel, this section of the route forms phase II of the Limerick Southern Ring Road and is tolled between junctions 2-4. North of the River Shannon the N18 continues as dual-carriageway bypassing Cratloe, Sixmilebridge and Bunratty. The road passed alongside Bunratty Castle before the completion of the neighbouring dual-carriageway section in the late 1980s/early 1990s. The other nearby junctions were also converted to fly-overs in the 1990s.

The road continues north with junctions at Hurler's Cross and Shannon Town, there is a fly-over connecting Shannon Airport via the N19 dual-carriageway.

M18 Shannon to Gort
The N18 continues north of the N19 junction where motorway regulations are enforced and the N18 route is designated as the M18 bypassing the towns of Newmarket-on-Fergus, Ennis and Gort. The motorway currently ends at Gort where the route continues as a single carriageway through County Galway. The dual-carriageway between Shannon and Ennis (including the Ennis bypass) was included in the second tranche of motorway redesignations and gained motorway status on 28 August 2009.

M18 Gort to Claregalway
DirectRoute (Tuam) Ltd., a consortium consisting of Marguerite Fund, InfraRed Capital Partners, Sisk Group, Lagan Construction Group, Roadbridge and Strabag began construction of the scheme in 2015 and was officially opened on 27 September 2017.

It completed the existing M18 motorway, bypassing the towns of Kilcolgan and Oranmore. The route then continues north to the M6 Dublin–Galway motorway, forming interchange junction 19 on the M6. It then continues northwards bypassing Claregalway. The M18 had terminated at a temporary junction near Gort. In addition, a new section of the N17 was constructed as motorway. This motorway begins at a new junction with the M6 near Athenry, and ends with a dual-carriageway bypass of Tuam, which was also constructed as part of the scheme but was not designated a motorway. The N17 then continues into County Mayo towards Sligo.

History 

Major improvements to the N18 route have been made over the past decade. Originally the route was a narrow single carriageway route that ran through all the main towns and villages between Limerick and Claregalway where the route terminates. The first improvements involved the dualling of the Limerick, Bunratty and Shannon route. The Newmarket on Fergus bypass opened in December 2002 and the Ennis bypass opened in 2007. Both were redesignated as motorway in August 2009. The Limerick Tunnel and phase II of the Limerick Southern Ring Road opened in July 2010 forming a continuous motorway dual-carriageway from the N/M18 to the M7 and M20 outside Limerick. On 12 November 2010 the €207 million Gort to Crusheen(M18) bypass was opened. The remaining single carriageway sections from Gort to Claregalway have been upgraded to motorway standard and were officially opened on 27 September 2017.

Junctions

See also
Roads in Ireland
Motorways in Ireland
National secondary road
Regional road

References

Roads Act 1993 (Classification of National Roads) Order 2006 – Department of Transport

External links
 Ennisbypass.ie – N18 website
 willsbros.com - Contractor's website

18
Roads in County Clare
Roads in County Limerick
Roads in County Galway